Gitaben Vajesingbhai Rathva or Geetaben Rathva, is an Indian politician and a member of parliament to the 17th Lok Sabha from Chhota Udaipur Lok Sabha constituency, Gujarat. She won the 2019 Indian general election being a Bharatiya Janata Party candidate.

References

Living people
India MPs 2019–present
Lok Sabha members from Gujarat
Bharatiya Janata Party politicians from Gujarat
Year of birth missing (living people)
People from Chhota Udaipur district
Women in Gujarat politics
21st-century Indian women politicians